Scotland was one of the earliest modern footballing nations, with Glasgow club Queen's Park early pioneers of the game throughout the UK. More clubs formed in Scotland, resulting in the commencement of the first major competition in 1873, the Scottish Cup, then the founding of the Scottish Football League in 1890. With the official sanctioning of professionalism, the Old Firm of Celtic and Rangers became dominant in Scotland, and remain so, although other clubs have enjoyed brief periods of success too.

The first officially recognized international football match took place between Scotland and England in 1872. Over time, Scotland began to play regularly against the other home nations too, and then on a yearly basis with the establishment of the British Home Championship in 1883. Scotland didn't compete against a nation from outside the British Isles until 1929 when they played Norway in Bergen, following which they began to contest regular friendly matches against other European sides. Scotland first competed in a major tournament when they qualified for the 1954 FIFA World Cup. They have qualified for a further seven World Cups since, although have exited at the group stage each time. Scotland have also qualified three times for the UEFA European Championships, in 1992, 1996 and the COVID-19 delayed 2020 tournament; failing to progress past the group stage each time.

The Scottish Football Association (SFA) were prominent in the administration of football since the early days of the game, and in 1882 agreed with the other home-nation associations on a uniform set of rules. They continue to play a role in this, with the SFA currently forming part of the International Football Association Board along with each of the other home-nation associations and four representatives from FIFA.

History
The game started to become popular in Scotland following the development in London in 1863 of the first ever rules of association football, established by The Football Association. Scottish football clubs started to be formed towards the end of the 1860s and 1870s, notably Queen's Park who were early pioneers of the game throughout the UK. The first officially recognised international football match took place in 1872 between Scotland and England at the West of Scotland Cricket Club's ground in Glasgow. The Scottish Football Association was formed in 1873, and the first official competition in Scotland commenced that same year, the Scottish Cup. The game in Scotland progressed further with the founding of the Scottish Football League in 1890, and the official sanctioning of professionalism in 1893.

Queens Park's insistence on remaining amateur saw their early prominence in Scottish football fade, and the Old Firm of Celtic and Rangers became the dominant clubs. Celtic won six successive league titles during the first decade of the 20th century, during which time they also became the first club to win the league and Scottish Cup in the same season (the "double"). They also won four successive titles the following decade. In the inter-war years, Rangers won 14 of the 20 league titles competed for, and a few years after the end of the Second World War were the first club to win all three major domestic competitions in the same season in Scotland (the "treble"). Both Old Firm clubs have since won nine successive league titles; Celtic from 1966 to 1974 and then again from 2012 to 2020, and Rangers from 1989 to 1997. Rangers have won the league championship a total of 55 times, a joint world record. Other clubs have enjoyed brief periods of success: Heart of Midlothian and Hibernian during the late 1940s and 1950s and Aberdeen, and to a lesser extent Dundee United, in the early 1980s.

Following the first international in 1872 between Scotland and England, over the next 50 years the national side played exclusively against the other three Home Nations – England, Wales and Ireland. The British Home Championship was established in 1883, making these games competitive. Scotland won the first ever championship, and won outright on ten occasions up to the First World War and shared the title on a further 6 times with at least one other team. Scotland played their first match outside the British Isles in 1929, beating Norway 7–3 in Bergen. Scotland then contested regular friendly matches against European opposition and enjoyed wins against Germany and France before losing to the Austrian "Wunderteam" and Italy in 1931.

Scotland took part in their first major international tournament when they qualified for the 1954 FIFA World Cup in Switzerland, and then again in 1958 for the World Cup in Sweden, failing to progress from the first round in both tournaments. After a barren spell in the 1960s, Scotland qualified for the 1974 FIFA World Cup in West Germany, where the team was unbeaten but failed to progress due to inferior goal difference. The national side also qualified for the 1978 FIFA World Cup in Argentina, amidst unprecedented publicity and optimism. They failed to win either of their first two games, and a win over the Netherlands wasn't enough to prevent another first round exit. The national side qualified for the next three World Cups in 1982, 1986 and 1990, but also exited at the first round in each. Scotland qualified for the finals of UEFA European Championship for the first time in 1992, and repeated the feat for the 1996 Euros in England. A further major tournament was reached when they took part in the 1998 FIFA World Cup in France, but then went over 20 years without qualifying for a major tournament. Scotland finally ended this barren run when they qualified for the COVID-19 delayed Euro 2020 tournament.

The Scottish Football Association (SFA) were prominent in the administration of football since the early days of the game. In 1882 they met up with other home-nation associations and agreed on a uniform set of rules for football. The home-nation associations went on to form the International Football Association Board (IFAB) to approve any changes to the rules. It was a proposal by the SFA that led to the offside rule being changed in 1925, where a player would now be onside if a minimum of two (instead of three) opposing players are between him and the goal line. IFAB continues to meet twice a year, once to decide on possible changes to the rules governing football and once to deliberate on its internal affairs. The organisation is now made up of representatives from the SFA, the other three home-nation associations, and the Fédération Internationale de Football Association (FIFA). Each home-nation association has one vote and FIFA has four. IFAB deliberations must be approved by three-quarters of the vote, which translates to at least six votes. Thus, FIFA's approval is necessary for any IFAB decision, but FIFA alone cannot change the Laws of the Game – they need to be agreed by at least two of the home-nation members. As of 2016, all members must be present for a binding vote to proceed.

Pre-1860

1824
The first documented club in the world dedicated to football, Foot-Ball Club, is formed in Edinburgh.

1860s

1867
Scotland's oldest club in continuous existence and longest established club Queen's Park is formed.
Queen's Park compile "The Rules of the Field", a set of rules based on the common Association rules of the time, but with notable changes to the offside rule.

1868
Queen's Park play their first match against another club, the newly formed Glasgow-based team Thistle.

1870s

1870

The first representative match is played between England and Scotland, although this is not considered to be an official international match.
In the absence of an organising body for football in Scotland, Queen's Park join the English Football Association.

1872
Queen's Park become the first ever Scottish football team to participate in official competition when they play in the 1871–72 FA Cup semi-final against Wanderers, the match ends goalless. Queen's, however, can not afford to extend their stay long enough for the tie to be replayed and are forced to withdraw.
Rangers are formed in March. In May, Rangers play their first ever match, a friendly against Callander, drawing 0-0, played at Fleshers' Haugh (now known as Glasgow Green).
Scotland and England draw 0–0, played at the West of Scotland Cricket Club. This is recognised by FIFA as the first official international match.

1873
The Scottish Football Association (SFA) is formed.
The first Scottish Cup competition begins.

1874
Queen's Park defeat Clydesdale 2–0 to win the inaugural Scottish Cup.

1876
Scotland defeat Wales 4–0 in the first international between the two countries.

1877
Vale of Leven win the Scottish Cup for the first time after beating Rangers 3–2 in a second replay – thereby becoming the first team other than Queen's Park to win the trophy.

1880s

1881

Dr. John Smith becomes the first player to score a hat-trick in a Scottish Cup Final, netting all three of Queen's Park's goals in a 3–1 win over Dumbarton. The final is a replay after the first match was won 2–1 by Queen's Park but declared void due to a protest from Dumbarton.
Andrew Watson wins his first cap for Scotland, becoming what is widely considered to be the world's first black person to play football at international level.
The first known women's match to be played under football association rules takes place at Easter Road. A team representing Scotland beat England 3–0, with Lily St Clare becoming the first ever recorded female goalscorer.

1882
The Scottish Football Association, the Football Association (England), the Football Association of Wales and the Irish Football Association meet on 6 December and agree on one uniform set of rules for football. They also establish the International Football Association Board (IFAB) to approve changes to the rules (a task that they still perform to this day).

1883
Dumbarton win the Scottish Cup for the first time, defeating Vale of Leven 2–1 in the 1883 Scottish Cup Final.

1884
The British Home Championship (also known as the Home International Championship) becomes an annual competition contested between the UK's four national teams, Scotland, England, Wales and Ireland. Scotland go on to win the first championship after winning all three of their matches.
Scotland defeat Ireland 5–0 in Belfast in the first international between the two countries.
Queen's Park reach the 1884 FA Cup Final, but lose 2–1 against Blackburn Rovers.

1885
Renton win the Scottish Cup for the first time, defeating Vale of Leven 3–1 in the 1885 Scottish Cup Final.
Arbroath defeat Bon Accord 36–0 in the first round of the Scottish Cup, a record scoreline in a major competition in British football. Jock Petrie scores 13 goals in the game, the highest number of goals by a player in a single game in competitive British football.

1886
The Scottish Junior Football Association is formed. The term "junior" refers to the level of football played, not the age of the players.
The first Scottish Junior Cup competition begins.

1887
Hibernian win the Scottish Cup for the first time, defeating Dumbarton 2–1 in the 1887 Scottish Cup Final.
The SFA instructs all its member clubs to withdraw from the FA Cup and to cease any further participation in that competition.
Fairfield Govan defeat Edinburgh Woodburn 3–1 in the first Scottish Junior Cup final.

1888
Renton defeat West Bromwich Albion 4–1 in a challenge match between the holders of the FA Cup and Scottish Cup. The winners are declared "Champions of the United Kingdom and the World".
Celtic play their first ever match, a friendly against Rangers, winning 5–2.

1889
Third Lanark win the Scottish Cup for the first time, defeating Celtic 2–1 in the 1889 Scottish Cup Final.

1890s

1890
The Scottish Football League is formed.

1891
Dumbarton and Rangers share the inaugural Scottish league championship after both finish with 29 points and a play-off match is drawn.
Heart of Midlothian win the Scottish Cup for the first time after beating Dumbarton 1–0 in the final.

1892
Celtic win the Scottish Cup for the first time after beating Queen's Park 5–1 in a replayed final.

1893
Celtic win the league title for the first time.
Professionalism is formally approved by the SFA.
The Highland Football League is founded by employees of the Highland Railway Company.

1894
Rangers win the Scottish Cup for the first time, defeating Celtic 3–1 in the first cup final between the two teams who would become known as the Old Firm.
Celtic build the first ever press box at a football stadium in Britain, located high up on the main stand at Celtic Park.

1895
Heart of Midlothian win the league title for the first time.
St Bernard's win the Scottish Cup for the first time, defeating Renton 2–1 in the final.

1896
The Scotland national team decides to select England-based players for the first time to improve their chances of winning the 1895–96 British Home Championship fixture against England, holding a selection trial between their 'Home' and 'Anglo' players Scotland win the match and the championship, and the trial becomes an annual event for the next 30 years.
Hearts defeat Hibernian in the first Edinburgh derby Scottish Cup final, and the only one to be held outside Glasgow.

1899
Rangers win the league title after winning all 18 of their league matches for a perfect season.

1900s

1902

25 people are killed and 517 are injured after a stand collapses at Ibrox Park during a British Home Championship match between Scotland and England.

1903
Hibernian win the league title for the first time.

1904
Third Lanark win the league title for the first time.
Jimmy Quinn scores a hat-trick as Celtic win the 1904 Scottish Cup Final 3–2 against Rangers.

1905
Celtic and Rangers finish the league level on 41 points, and a play-off at Hampden Park is arranged to decide the championship. Celtic win 2–1, clinching the first of what transpired to be six successive league titles.

1907
Celtic win both the league title and the Scottish Cup in the same season, becoming the first club to win the double in Scotland.

1909
The Scottish Cup is withheld by the SFA after a riot in the final replay between Celtic and Rangers.
The Scottish Amateur Football Association (SAFA), the organising body for amateur football across Scotland, is formed.

1910s

1910
Dundee win the Scottish Cup for the first time after beating Clyde 2–1 in the twice-replayed final.
The SFA joins the Fédération Internationale de Football Association (FIFA), the international governing body for association football.

1913
Falkirk beat Raith Rovers 2–0 in the final of the Scottish Cup to win the trophy for the first time.

1914
Thirteen players from Heart of Midlothian sign-up en-masse with the McCrae's Battalion to fight in the First World War, in addition to their three players who had earlier enlisted in the services.

1917
Celtic complete a 62 match unbeaten run, a record in British football that stood for over 100 years.

1920s

1920
The SFA, along with the other three home-nation associations, withdraw from FIFA, primarily due to issues over playing ex-enemy countries from the First World War.

1921
Goal average is brought in by the Scottish League to separate teams tied on the same number of points.

1922
Morton win the Scottish Cup for the first time, defeating Rangers 1–0 in the final.
Falkirk sign Syd Puddefoot from West Ham United for a transfer fee of £5,000 – a world record at the time.

1924
Airdrieonians win the Scottish Cup for the first (and only) time, defeating Hibernian 2–0 in the final.
The SFA and the three other home-nation associations rejoin FIFA.

1925
Following a proposal by the SFA, the offside rule is changed: a player is now onside if a minimum of two (instead of three) opposing players are between him and the goal line.

1926
St Mirren win the Scottish Cup for the first time, defeating Celtic 2–0 in the final.

1928
Scotland defeat England 5–1 at Wembley, during which Alex Jackson scores the first ever hat-trick at Wembley. The Scotland team become popularly known as the Wembley Wizards.
The SFA, along with the other three home-nation associations, once again withdraw from FIFA, due to the home nations reluctance to cede ultimate authority on football matters to FIFA.

1929
Scotland play against opposition outside of England, Wales and Ireland for the first time, defeating Norway 7–3 in Bergen.

1930s

1931
Celtic goalkeeper John Thomson dies after suffering a fractured skull after an accidental on-pitch collision with Rangers striker Sam English during a match at Ibrox Park. A reported 30,000 mourners attend his funeral in Fife.

1932
Motherwell win the league title for the first time.
Willie MacFadyen scores 52 league goals for Motherwell, a record goals total for a single season in Scottish League history.

1934
Aberdeen's Pittodrie Stadium becomes the first football ground to feature a dugout, a sunken, sheltered area for note taking.

1937
The Scotland v England match at Hampden Park is attended by 149,415, a European record. 
The 1937 Scottish Cup Final between Celtic and Aberdeen is attended by 147,365, a world record for a national cup final.
Jimmy McGrory retires from playing football. He scored 550 goals in competitive matches for Celtic, Clydebank, Scotland and the Scottish League XI. He remains the highest goalscorer in British football.

1939
Rangers defeat Celtic 2–1 in front of a crowd of 118,567 at Ibrox, a record attendance for a league match in Britain.
Competitive football is suspended due to the outbreak of the Second World War in Europe, during the early stages of the 1939–40 season.

1940s

1944
Scotland's 3–2 defeat at Hampden Park in the wartime international against England is watched by 133,000 fans, the largest attendance at any match in Britain during wartime.

1946
Official competitive football resumes after the Second World War.
The SFA, along with the other three home-nation associations, rejoin FIFA, paving the way for Scotland to play in World Cup matches.

1947
Rangers win the first League Cup, as they defeat Aberdeen 4–0 at Hampden Park to win the 1946–47 competition.
Hampden Park hosts a friendly match between a UK representative team and a Rest of the World XI. The game is dubbed "Match of the Century", with the UK winning 6–1 in front of 135,000 spectators. The gate receipts of £35,000 are donated to FIFA to help assist with the financial losses incurred as a result of the Second World War.
East Fife are the second winners of the League Cup, after defeating Falkirk 4–1 in the replayed final of the 1947–48 competition.

1948
The Great Britain Olympic football team, managed by Matt Busby, finish in fourth place at the 1948 Olympics football tournament in London. The squad includes five Scots, all from Queens Park (one of whom is goalkeeper Ronnie Simpson, who will go on to play in Celtic's 1967 European Cup Final winning team).

1949
Rangers win the league title, League Cup and the Scottish Cup in season 1948–49, thereby becoming the first club to win the domestic treble in Scotland.

1950s

1950
Scotland qualify for the 1950 FIFA World Cup by finishing second in the 1949–50 British Home Championship (which had doubled up as a qualifying group), but the SFA reject the offer of a place in the World Cup finals because they had not won the tournament.
Motherwell win the League Cup for the first time after a 3–0 win over Hibernian in the final.

1951
Dundee win the League Cup for the first time after defeating Rangers 3–2 in the final.
Petershill beat Irvine Meadow in the Scottish Junior Cup final. The attendance of 77,650 is a record for the competition.
Jamaican born Gil Heron signs for Celtic, and becomes the first black footballer to play professionally in Scotland.
The first match played under modern floodlights in Scotland takes place, a friendly at Ochilview Park between Stenhousemuir and Hibernian.

1953
 Celtic win the Coronation Cup, defeating Hibernian 2–0 in the final.

1954
After qualifying for the World Cup, Scotland are knocked-out after a 1–0 defeat by Austria and a 7–0 defeat by Uruguay. Andy Beattie, appointed manager for the World Cup campaign, is Scotland's first manager but resigns after the loss to Austria.
Bill Struth stands down as manager of Rangers after 34 years in the role, having won 18 league titles. He is succeeded by Scot Symon.
Heart of Midlothian win the League Cup for the first time, as they defeat Motherwell 4–2 in the final.
The SFA joins the Union of European Football Associations (UEFA), the administrative body for association football in Europe.

1955
The 1955 Scottish Cup Final between Celtic and Clyde is the first final in Scotland to be televised live, and ends in a 1–1 draw. Clyde win the replay 1–0.
Aberdeen win the league title for the first time.
Hibernian become the first British club to participate in European competition. They go on to reach the semi-final of the inaugural European Cup, where they were knocked out by Stade Reims.
Aberdeen win the League Cup for the first time, defeating St Mirren 2–1 in the final.

1956
The first Scottish league match played under floodlights takes place, between Rangers and Queen of the South at Ibrox.
Celtic win the League Cup for the first time, after a 3–0 win over Partick Thistle in the replayed final.

1957
Scotland qualify for the 1958 FIFA World Cup, after finishing top of their qualifying group.
Celtic defeat Rangers 7–1 in the League Cup final, a record scoreline in a major cup final in British football.

1958
Heart of Midlothian score a record 132 goals, while conceding only 29, in winning the Scottish league championship.
Jimmy Murray scores Scotland's first ever goal in a World Cup finals match.
Scotland are eliminated from the 1958 FIFA World Cup at the group stage, having taken one point from three games.

1960s

1960
Rangers reach the semi-final of the European Cup, where they are knocked out by Eintracht Frankfurt.
Hampden Park hosts the 1960 European Cup Final between Real Madrid and Eintracht Frankfurt. Real win 7–3 in one of the best known European finals, and regarded by many observers as one of the greatest matches of all time. The crowd of 134,000 is a record for a European final.

1961
Rangers lose 4–1 on aggregate to ACF Fiorentina in the final of the inaugural European Cup Winners' Cup.
Dunfermline Athletic under manager Jock Stein reach the final of the Scottish Cup for the first time and win the trophy beating Celtic 2–0 in a replay after a 0–0 draw.

1962
Dundee win the league title for the first time.

1963
Dundee reach the semi-final of the European Cup, losing on aggregate to AC Milan.

1964
Celtic reach the semi-finals of the European Cup Winners' Cup, where they lose 4–3 on aggregate to MTK Budapest.
Rangers win the domestic treble.

1965
Kilmarnock win the league title for the first time, defeating Heart of Midlothian 2–0 on the final day of the season to win the league on goal average ahead of Heart of Midlothian.

1966
The Scottish Football League authorise the use of substitutes in competitive games. Archie Gemmill of St Mirren becomes the first substitute in Scotland, coming for the injured Jim Clunie in a League Cup tie against Clyde.

1967

Berwick Rangers defeat Rangers 1–0 in the first round of the Scottish Cup, one of the biggest all-time shocks in the Cup, and described by Rangers' captain John Greig as "probably the worst result in the history of our club".
Scotland defeat 1966 FIFA World Cup winners England 3–2 at Wembley.
Celtic win the European Cup, defeating Inter Milan 2–1 in the 1967 European Cup Final. Celtic also win the domestic treble for their first time.
Rangers reach the 1967 European Cup Winners' Cup Final, but lose 1–0 after extra time against Bayern Munich.
Third Lanark go out of business after becoming bankrupt.

1968
Rangers sign Colin Stein from Hibernian for a then Scottish record transfer fee of £100,000.

1969
Celtic win the domestic treble.

1970s

1970
Celtic reach the final of the European Cup, knocking out Benfica and Leeds United en route, but lose 2–1 to Feyenoord in the final.
The introduction of penalty shootouts was sanctioned at the Caledonian Hotel in Inverness. Airdrieonians vs Nottingham Forest in the Texaco Cup was the first game in Scotland to be decided by penalties, with Airdrieonians progressing to the Quarter Finals.

1971
66 people die and over 200 are injured after a crush during a match between Rangers and Celtic at Ibrox Park, after a stairway gave way.
Partick Thistle win the League Cup for the first time, defeating Celtic 4–1 in the final.
Goal difference replaces goal average as the means of separating teams tied on the same number of points in the Scottish League.

1972
Dixie Deans scores a hat-trick in Celtic's 6–1 win over Hibernian in the 1972 Scottish Cup Final, the first hat-trick in a Scottish Cup Final since 1904.
Rangers beat Dynamo Moscow 3–2 to win the European Cup Winners' Cup. Rangers are beaten 6–3 on aggregate by European Cup winners Ajax in the UEFA Super Cup.
Hibernian win the League Cup for the first time, defeating Celtic 2–1 in the final.
The Scottish Women’s Football Association is formed, and Scotland play their first ever official women's international, losing 3–2 to England in Greenock.

1973
Rose Reilly signs for Stade de Reims, becoming the first Scots woman to play football professionally.
The crowd of 122,714 that watches Rangers win over Celtic in the 1973 Scottish Cup Final is the last attendance in excess of 100,000 at any match in Britain.
A 2–1 win over Czechoslovakia at Hampden Park guarantees Scotland a place at the 1974 World Cup after finishing 1st in their qualifying group.

1974

Celtic win their ninth consecutive league championship, equalling the world record jointly held at the time by CSKA Sofia and MTK Budapest.
Scotland are eliminated from the 1974 World Cup at the group stages on goal difference, despite not having lost a match.
Dixie Deans and Joe Harper both score hat-tricks in the 1974 Scottish League Cup Final. Deans became the first (and so far, only) player to score hat-tricks in Scottish Cup and League Cup finals.

1975
The Scottish Football League is reconstructed, producing a Premier Division of 10 clubs.

1976
Rangers win the domestic treble.

1977
Scotland clinch qualification for the following year's World Cup in Argentina with a controversial 2–0 win over Wales at Anfield.
Hibernian become the first professional club in Britain to bear sponsorship on their shirts.
Clydebank bolt wooden bench seating to their ground's terraces (reducing its capacity under 10,000 to avoid having to comply with expensive safety legislation), and thus Kilbowie Park accommodating 9,950 becomes the first all-seater stadium in Britain.

1978
Rangers win the domestic treble.
Scotland are knocked out of the 1978 FIFA World Cup at the group stage, having taken three points (one win, one draw) from three matches.
Jock Stein leaves Celtic, having won 25 trophies including the European Cup in 1967, for a brief spell as manager of Leeds United, before returning north to take over from Ally MacLeod as manager of Scotland.
Alex Ferguson becomes manager of Aberdeen, who he goes on to lead to what several sources describe as "unprecedented success", taking over from Billy McNeill who moved to Celtic as their manager.

1979
Dundee United win the League Cup for the first time, defeating Aberdeen 3–0 in the replayed final.

1980s

1980
Aberdeen win the league title, the first side outwith the Old Firm to do so since Kilmarnock in 1965.
Celtic beat Rangers in the Scottish Cup Final. Thousands of fans from both sides take to the field afterwards and engage in a pitched battle with one another. The aftermath sees both clubs fined £20,000 and various legislation implemented, including the prohibition of the sale of alcohol at football matches in Scotland.
Hibernian are the first Scottish club to install undersoil heating, at a cost of £60,000, and which is used later in the season to enable their home game against Falkirk to be played despite the wintry weather conditions.
Ian Wallace becomes the first Scottish footballer to be transferred for over a million pounds, joining Nottingham Forest from Coventry City for £1.25 million.

1982
The Scotland under-18 side win the 1982 UEFA European Under-18 Championship, defeating Czechoslovakia 3–1 in the final. It remains Scotland's only major tournament win at any level.
Scotland are knocked out of the 1982 FIFA World Cup at the group stage, having taken three points (one win, one draw) from three matches.

1983
Aberdeen beat Real Madrid 2–1 after extra time to win the European Cup Winners' Cup. Aberdeen also win the UEFA Super Cup after a 2–0 aggregate win over Hamburger SV.
Dundee United win the league title for the first time.

1984
Rangers defeat Celtic 3–2 in the 1983–84 League Cup Final, with Ally McCoist scoring a hat-trick.
Dundee United reach the semi-final of the European Cup, losing on aggregate to AS Roma.

1985
Scotland qualify for the 1986 World Cup, but manager Jock Stein suffers a heart attack and dies during a qualifying match with Wales.

1986
Kenny Dalglish wins his 100th cap for Scotland, in a friendly match against Romania. He eventually goes on to win 102 caps, a record.
Graeme Souness is appointed player/manager of Rangers. This marks the start of a significant change at Rangers, as they spend significant amounts of money in attracting star players to the club from England.
Celtic win the league championship on goal difference, ahead of Heart of Midlothian.  Two late goals scored by Dundee forward Albert Kidd cost Heart of Midlothian the championship.
Scotland are knocked out of the 1986 FIFA World Cup at the group stage, having taken one point from three matches.
Alex Ferguson leaves Aberdeen, having won ten trophies in eight years including the European Cup Winners' Cup in 1983, to become manager of Manchester United.

1987
Dundee United reach the 1987 UEFA Cup Final, but lose 2–1 on aggregate to IFK Göteborg.
Rangers win their first league title in nine years.
Richard Gough becomes the first million pound transfer in Scottish football, joining Rangers from Tottenham Hotspur for around £1.5 million.
Rangers defeat Aberdeen on penalty kicks in the 1987–88 League Cup Final, after the sides tied at 3–3 after extra time.

1988
Celtic win the league and cup double in their centenary season.

1989
Scotland host the FIFA Under 16 World Championship, reaching the final where they lose on penalty kicks against Saudi Arabia after the match finished 2–2 at the end of extra time.
Former Celtic player Mo Johnston signs for Rangers, ending the club's long-term policy of not signing Roman Catholics.
St Johnstone open McDiarmid Park, the first purpose-built all-seater football stadium in the United Kingdom.

1990s

1990
Scotland are knocked out of the 1990 FIFA World Cup at the group stage, having taken two points (one win) from three matches.

1991
Graeme Souness leaves Rangers to become manager of Liverpool. His assistant, Walter Smith, takes over at Ibrox, and six years later would lead the club to their ninth successive league title.
Rangers win the league championship thanks to a decisive win against Aberdeen on the final day of the season.

1992
Having qualified for the first time, Scotland take part in the finals of the UEFA European Championship. They are knocked out at the group stage of UEFA Euro 1992, having taken two points (one win) from three matches.
Rangers become the first British club to compete in the group stages of the revamped UEFA Champions League, where they went undefeated but eventually finished second in their group behind eventual (controversial) winners Marseille.
Top clubs attempt a 'Super League' breakaway following a similar event in England; the move fails but prompts some reconstruction of the League setup which takes effect two years later.

1993
Rangers win the domestic treble.

1994

Fergus McCann takes over as owner of Celtic, rescuing the club from financial ruin. He goes on to reconstitute the club as a PLC, which in turn leads to the most successful share-issue in the history of British football.
Dundee United win the Scottish Cup for the first time, defeating Rangers 1–0 in the final.
Inverness Caledonian Thistle and Ross County are admitted to the Scottish Football League.
Raith Rovers win the League Cup for the first time, defeating Celtic 6–5 on penalties after a 2–2 draw in the final.

1995
Meadowbank Thistle relocate to Livingston, West Lothian and are renamed Livingston.

1996

Scotland are knocked out of UEFA Euro 1996 at the group stage on goal difference, having taken four points from three games.

1997
Rangers win their ninth league championship in a row, equalling the record set by Celtic.
Paul Lambert becomes the first Scottish (and British) player to win the European Cup/ Champions League with a non-UK club, playing for Borussia Dortmund

1998
Celtic stop Rangers from winning a record 10 league titles in a row by winning the Scottish league championship.
Scotland are knocked out of the 1998 FIFA World Cup at the group stage, with 1 point from 3 matches played.
The Scottish Premier League is formed, as the Premier Division clubs break away from the Scottish Football League.

1999
Rangers win the domestic treble.
Scotland fail to qualify for UEFA Euro 2000, losing a two match play-off 2–1 on aggregate to England.

2000s

2000
Inverness Caledonian Thistle defeat Celtic 3–1 in the third round of the Scottish Cup. The result, one of the biggest ever upsets in Scottish football, leads to the famous newspaper headline "Super Caley Go Ballistic Celtic Are Atrocious" by The Sun.
Elgin City and Peterhead are admitted to the Scottish Football League.
Tore André Flo joins Rangers from Chelsea for a transfer fee of £12 million, a Scottish record.

2001
Celtic win the domestic treble, their first since 1969.
Henrik Larsson scores 35 league goals for Celtic, winning him the European Golden Shoe.
Ally McCoist retires from playing football. He is the highest post-war goalscorer in the Scottish league, with 282 goals.

2002

Berti Vogts is appointed the Scotland national team manager, the first non-Scot to hold the post.
Airdrieonians are liquidated. Gretna are admitted to the Scottish Football League in their place.
A consortium buys out the few remaining assets of Clydebank, in order to bring Airdrie United into the league.

2003
Celtic reach the 2003 UEFA Cup Final, but lose 3–2 to F.C. Porto after extra time.
Rangers win the domestic treble.

2004
Livingston win the League Cup for the first time, defeating Hibernian 2–0 in the 2004 Scottish League Cup Final.

2005
Rangers win the league championship on the last day of the season, as Celtic concede two late goals against Motherwell.
Rangers become the first Scottish club to progress from the group stages of the UEFA Champions League to the knockout phase of the tournament.

2006
Scotland reach the final of the UEFA European Under-19 Championship, but lose 2–1 to Spain.
Gretna become the first team from the third tier to reach the Scottish Cup Final, and draw 1–1 with Hearts after extra  time, before losing on penalty kicks.

2007
Motherwell captain Phil O'Donnell, 35, collapses on the pitch during a Scottish league match against Dundee United, and dies shortly afterwards.
Celtic sign Scott Brown from Hibernian for £4.4 million, a record transfer fee paid between two Scottish clubs.
The SFA implement changes to qualifying rules for the Scottish Cup, including the allowing of four Scottish Junior Football Association clubs to enter each year.

2008
Gretna enter administration. Unable to fulfil fixtures, Gretna resign from the Scottish Football League and are subsequently liquidated. Gretna fans set up a new club, Gretna 2008, in its place. Annan Athletic are admitted to the Scottish Football League to fill the vacancy.
Rangers reach the 2008 UEFA Cup Final, but lose 2–0 to Zenit St. Petersburg.

2009
Livingston are demoted two divisions for breaching Scottish Football League rules.

2010s

2010
Referees go on strike in Scotland over the course of a weekend in November 2010 following a series of controversial incidents and criticism.

2011
Celtic manager Neil Lennon and two high-profile supporters of the club are sent parcel bombs. The device sent to Lennon is intercepted by the Royal Mail, whilst the two other devices are delivered but treated as suspicious packages and not opened.

2012
Kilmarnock win the League Cup for the first time, defeating Celtic 1–0 in the final.
In the first Edinburgh derby Scottish Cup final since 1896, Heart of Midlothian defeat Hibernian by a 5–1 scoreline.
Rangers enter administration with debts attaining several tens of millions of pounds, including amounts due to HM Revenue & Customs (HMRC). Rangers FC plc is liquidated after HMRC rejects a CVA offer from Charles Green, the preferred bidder. Green instead buys the business and assets of Rangers from the administrator and forms a new Rangers company, which is denied entry to the Scottish Premier League and is instead admitted into the Scottish Football League Third Division.

2013
St Mirren win the League Cup for the first time, defeating Hearts 3–2 in the final.
Heart of Midlothian enter administration, with most of its debts owed to companies connected to Lithuanian owner Vladimir Romanov.
The Scottish Professional Football League is formed by a merger of the Scottish Premier League and Scottish Football League.
A new Lowland Football League is formed, as part of wider league reconstruction.
Celtic sell Victor Wanyama to Southampton for £12.5 million, a record at the time for a fee received by a Scottish club.

2014
St Johnstone win the Scottish Cup for the first time, defeating Dundee United 2–0 in the final.

2015
Inverness Caledonian Thistle win the Scottish Cup for the first time, defeating Falkirk 2–1 in the final.

2016
Ross County win the League Cup for the first time, defeating Hibernian 2–1 in the final.
Edinburgh City become the first club to be promoted to the SPFL, under the pyramid system instituted in 2013.
Hibernian win the Scottish Cup for the first time since 1902, defeating Rangers 3–2 in the final.
Oliver Burke joins RB Leipzig from Nottingham Forest for a transfer fee of around £13 million, a record fee at the time for a transfer involving a Scottish player.

2017
Celtic win the domestic treble, while going unbeaten in domestic competitive matches for the whole of the 2016–17 season.
The Scotland women's national team qualify for their first major tournament, the UEFA Women's Euro 2017. Despite a win against Spain in their third match, the team is eliminated on head-to-head record in the group stage.
Celtic complete a run of 69 matches unbeaten in domestic competitions, breaking their own record of 62 games from over 100 years earlier.

2018
Dumbarton reach the final of the Scottish Challenge Cup, the club's first major cup final appearance since the 1896–97 Scottish Cup, 121 years earlier. They are beaten 1–0 by Inverness Caledonian Thistle.
Brechin City fail to win a game in the 2017–18 Scottish Championship, becoming the first Scottish club since Vale of Leven in 1891–92 to go a full season without winning a league game. Brechin also equal the Scottish record for the fewest points scored in a season (four).
Celtic win the domestic treble for a second consecutive season (the "double treble"), the first Scottish club to do so.
Celtic sell Moussa Dembélé to Lyon for €22 million (about £19.7 million), at the time a record transfer fee received by a Scottish club.
Scotland women qualify for their first World Cup finals, by winning UEFA Group 2 with a 2–1 win over Albania in their last group match.

2019
Cove Rangers become the first club to gain promotion from the Highland League to the SPFL. They replaced Berwick Rangers, meaning all 42 SPFL clubs are now based in Scotland.
Celtic win all three domestic trophies for the third consecutive season (the "treble treble").
Scotland are knocked out of the 2019 FIFA Women's World Cup at the group stage, with one point from three matches played.
Oli McBurnie moves to Sheffield United from Swansea City for a transfer fee of around £20 million, a record fee for a transfer involving a Scottish player. This record is broken less than a week later, when Kieran Tierney joins Arsenal from Celtic for £25 million.
Queen's Park, Scotland's oldest club, vote to go professional after 152 years as amateurs

2020s

2020
 Due to the spread of the COVID-19 pandemic within the United Kingdom, all football in Scotland is suspended on 13 March 2020.
 A new West of Scotland Football League is formed below the Lowland League as part of the senior pyramid system, which sees all 63 clubs join from the West Region of Junior football.
 Scottish Premiership clubs resume training on 11 June 2020, with a view to starting the 2020–21 Premiership season on the first weekend of August 2020, albeit still behind closed doors due to the ongoing COVID-19 pandemic.
 Scotland qualify for UEFA Euro 2020, delayed until 2021 due to the COVID-19 pandemic, by winning a play-off against Serbia on penalties.
 Celtic win all three domestic trophies for a fourth consecutive season (the "quadruple treble"), with their league title being their ninth consecutive championship.

2021
St Johnstone win the Scottish League Cup for the first time, defeating Livingston 1–0 in the final. They go on to complete a cup double by winning the Scottish Cup for the second time, defeating Hibernian 1–0 in the final.
Rangers prevent Celtic from winning a record 10 league titles in a row by winning the Scottish Premiership and their 55th league title.
Brechin City become the first club to be relegated from the SPFL into the Highland League after defeat to Kelty Hearts in the League Two play-off, their third relegation in four seasons.
Scotland are knocked out of the COVID-19 delayed UEFA Euro 2020 at the group stage, with 1 point from 3 matches played.
All leagues above amateur level are connected for the first time as part of the senior pyramid system, after the SJFA East Region (Midlands League), SJFA North Region, and North Caledonian League join as feeders to the Highland League.

2022
Rangers reach the 2022 UEFA Europa League Final, but they lose on penalties to Eintracht Frankfurt.
The Video Assistant Referee (VAR) is introduced to the Scottish Premiership on matchday 12 in October, having previously been used in Scotland for games at UEFA Euro 2020, as well as Champions League group stage, and Europa League knockout stage matches.

2023 

 West of Scotland Premier Division side, Darvel beat Premiership side, Aberdeen 1–0 in the biggest cup shock in the cup's history. Darvel become the first non league side to knock out a top flight team since Elgin City knocked out Ayr United in 1966.

See also
 Football in Scotland

References 

 
Scottish football